Plateau Mountain may refer to the following mountains.

 Plateau Mountain (Alaska)
 Plateau Mountain (New York)